Huglecus is one of the legendary Danish kings in Saxo Grammaticus' Gesta Danorum. Like Hygelac, he fought against Swedes but he is only given a very short biography.

References

Mythological kings of Denmark